Ehsan Khandozi (born 1980) is an Iranian economist and politician who has been serving as the minister of economic and financial affairs since August 2021.

Early life and education
Hailed from a religious family Khandozi was born in Gorgan in 1980. From 1998 he studied Islamic sciences and economics at Imam Sadiq University. He has a Ph.D. in economics which he obtained from Islamic Azad University.

Career
Khandozi worked as the head of the Basij. In 2013 he was made the economy director of the Parliamentary Research Center. From 2014 he began to work at Allameh Tabataba'i University. He was elected to the Majlis in 2020 representing Tehran becoming a member of the 11th term and served there in different commissions related to economy. He was nominated as the minister of economic and financial affairs to the cabinet of Iranian President Ebrahim Raisi and was confirmed by the Majlis on 25 August 2021. He received 254 votes in favor.

Work
Khandozi has published various articles and three books, including A just city: An introduction to the theory of economic justice in the Quran.

References

External links

21st-century Iranian politicians
1980 births
Finance ministers of Iran
People from Gorgan
Imam Sadiq University alumni
Islamic Azad University alumni
Academic staff of Allameh Tabataba'i University
Living people
Members of the 11th Islamic Consultative Assembly
Deputies of Tehran, Rey, Shemiranat and Eslamshahr
Iranian economists